Jordan Sturdy is a Canadian politician, who was elected to the Legislative Assembly of British Columbia in the 2013 provincial election, for the electoral district of West Vancouver-Sea to Sky as a member of the British Columbia Liberal Party.

Prior to his election to the legislature, Sturdy served as mayor of Pemberton for eight years.

On June 12, 2017, he was appointed to Cabinet as Minister of the Environment.

In the 2020 British Columbia general election, he was initially declared defeated in his riding by Jeremy Valeriote of the British Columbia Green Party, but won reelection by just 41 votes once all mail-in and absentee ballots had been counted. A judicial recount was held due to the small margin of victory, which affirmed Sturdy's 41 vote lead.

Electoral record

References

British Columbia Liberal Party MLAs
Living people
Mayors of places in British Columbia
Members of the Executive Council of British Columbia
21st-century Canadian politicians
Year of birth missing (living people)